Mackenzia is an elongated bag-like animal known from the Middle Cambrian Burgess Shale.  It attached directly to hard surfaces, such as brachiopod shells. 14 specimens of Mackenzia are known from the Greater Phyllopod bed, where they comprise <0.1% of the community. Mackenzia was originally described by Charles Walcott in 1911 as a holothurian echinoderm. Later, Mackenzia is thought to be a cnidarian and appears most similar to modern sea anemones.

References

External links 
 

Burgess Shale fossils
Actiniaria
Burgess Shale animals
Prehistoric Hexacorallia genera
Fossil taxa described in 1911

Cambrian genus extinctions